Raxaul Assembly constituency is an assembly constituency in Purvi Champaran district in the Indian state of Bihar. Current Member Of legislative Assembly is Pramod Kumar Sinha.

Overview
As per orders of Delimitation of Parliamentary and Assembly constituencies Order, 2008, 10. Raxaul Assembly constituency is composed of the following: Raxaul and Adapur community development blocks.

Raxaul Assembly constituency is part of 2. Paschim Champaran (Lok Sabha constituency). It was earlier part of Bettiah (Lok Sabha constituency).

Members of Legislative Assembly

Election results

2010

2015

2020

References

External links
 

Assembly constituencies of Bihar
Politics of East Champaran district